Ilya Lukashevich (born 1 August 1998) is a Belarusian professional footballer who plays for Shakhtyor Soligorsk.

Career

Club career
Born in capital Minsk, he was a product of the FC Minsk academy where he played since 2012. His first experience as senior was in 2015 when he was included in FC Minsk reserves squad. He then debuted for Minsk main team in the 2017 Belarusian Premier League with 2 appearances, and in the  next season he became regular, finishing the year with 22 appearances. His regular games made him become consistent call at the Belarusian U21 team, and with his team Minsk finishing season 11th, he called the attention of Torpedo-BelAZ Zhodino which had finished fifth. In summer 2019 Lukashevich decided left for a  Serbian top-flight side FK Proleter Novi Sad after successful trials. He debuted in the 2019–20 Serbian SuperLiga on September 14, in a home game against FK Partizan.

International career
Lukashevich has been a presence at Belarusian youth national teams ever since 2016. After passing through Belarus U19 level, it is since 2018 that his presence has been regular at Belarusian U21 squad.

Honours
Shakhtyor Soligorsk
Belarusian Super Cup winner: 2023

References

External links 
 
 
 Profile at FC Minsk website 

1998 births
Living people
Belarusian footballers
Association football defenders
Belarusian expatriate footballers
Expatriate footballers in Serbia
Belarusian Premier League players
Serbian SuperLiga players
FC Minsk players
FC Torpedo-BelAZ Zhodino players
FK Proleter Novi Sad players
FC Shakhtyor Soligorsk players
FC Gorodeya players
FC Sputnik Rechitsa players
FC Energetik-BGU Minsk players